Victor Mikhailovich Shkulev (born 13 April 1958) is a  Russian journalist, publisher, media manager. He is the president of Hearst Shkulev Media (ELLE, Maxim, Antenna-Telesem, Hearst Shkulev Digital). Entered the top five most influential media managers post-Soviet Russia by the magazine "Career" and the weekly newspaper "New Look". Deputy Chairman of FIPP.

Education 
 In 1981 have graduated from Irkutsk State University. 
 Post-graduate education in the Academy of Social Sciences (CLI). 
 In 1991 in his thesis on the theory of law, PhD.

Career
 1992 - 1993 - in charge of the legal department in the "Komsomolskaya Pravda", and later - CFO, and - CEO newspaper and then CEO Komsomolskaya Pravda Publishing House. 
 1993 - 1997. - General Director of "Komsomolskaya Pravda". 
 1995 - 2011 - the president 'ID Hachette Filipacchi Shkulev' '. 
 1997 - 1998 - Director General of Foreign 'Komsomolskaya Pravda - A group of "Today." 
 Since 1998 - Chairman of the Board of Directors 'ID InterMediaGroup'. 
 2011 - present - president of "Hearst Shkulev Media» 
 Deputy Chairman of FIPP (International Federation of the Periodical Press), a member of the Management Board of the Guild of Press Publishers (HIPD), chairman of the Non-Commercial Partnership "Publishing Initiative."

Personal life
The eldest daughter Natalia Shkuleva  (born 31 May 1980), a publisher of magazine Elle (Russian edition), who is married to Andrey Malakhov, Russian showman, publisher "StarHit" Magazine.

References

1958 births
Living people